William Joseph Van Landingham (born July 16, 1970) is a former pitcher in Major League Baseball who played his entire Major League career with the San Francisco Giants.

Career
Van Landingham's rookie season of 1994 was his best, when he posted an 8–2 record with a 3.54 ERA and finished seventh in the balloting for the Rookie of the Year Award.  His 1995 season was similar, but as a full-time starting pitcher in 1996 he posted a 9–14 record with a 5.40 ERA.  After similar results in the first half of 1997, the Giants released him. He was known as "William Van Launching Pad" due to his propensity to give up home runs.

Van Landingham played his final Major League Baseball game on July 27, 1997. After being affiliated with the Angels, Expos, and Brewers in the minor leagues, he moved to Athens, Georgia, to live with his family.

Name length
Van Landingham was widely considered to have set the record for longest surname in the history of Major League Baseball, at 13 or 14 characters (depending on whether one counts the space), though his record has since been tied or broken (again, depending on the reckoning of the space) by Jarrod Saltalamacchia.  When Van Landingham pitched to Todd Hollandsworth in 1995, the two set a record for longest combined pitcher-batter name length (since at least 1957) at 26 letters.  On May 29, 1996, Van Landingham started against Jason Isringhausen, then a starter for the New York Mets, tying a record for the longest combined names of two starting pitchers.

Van Landingham also set the record for longest complete name in Major League Baseball at 20 letters. The record has since been tied by Jarrod Saltalamacchia.

External links
Baseball Reference

References

1970 births
Living people
Kentucky Wildcats baseball players
San Francisco Giants players
Major League Baseball pitchers
Baseball players from Tennessee
People from Columbia, Tennessee
Clinton Giants players
Everett Giants players
Phoenix Firebirds players
San Jose Giants players
Shreveport Captains players
Vancouver Canadians players
American expatriate baseball players in Canada